Eugene Rudolph Rye [Half-Pint] (November 15, 1906 – January 21, 1980) was an American left fielder in Major League Baseball who played with the Boston Red Sox during the  season.

Listed at 5'6", 165 lb., Rye batted left-handed and threw right-handed.

His birth name was Eugene Rudolph Mercantelli, the son of Amedeo Menotti Mercantelli (1866-1950) and Daria "Dora" Frediani (1867-1920). He was born in Chicago, Illinois. Rye married Julia Swentko on October 28, 1950.

Used as a pinch hitter by Boston, Rye also shared duties at left field with Al Van Camp and Jack Rothrock. In a 17-game career, he posted a .179 batting average (7-for-39) with three runs and one run batted in with no extra-base hits. In 10 outfield appearances, he had 10 putouts and committed an error for a .944 fielding percentage.

Rye hit three home runs in one inning in 1930 while playing with the Waco Cubs in the Texas League.  The third home run is considered one of the greatest minor league baseball home runs of all time.

When Rye was 29 years old he finished his professional baseball career after his 1936 season.

Rye died at the age of 73 in Park Ridge, Illinois.

See also
1931 Boston Red Sox season
Boston Red Sox all-time roster

References

External links

1906 births
1980 deaths
Major League Baseball left fielders
Boston Red Sox players
Baseball players from Chicago